Pedro Henrique Azevedo Pereira (born 11 July 2002), commonly known as Pedrinho, is a Brazilian footballer who plays for Athletico Paranaense as a left back.

Club career

Vitória
Born in Salvador, Bahia, Pedrinho was a Vitória youth graduate. He made his first team debut on 29 January 2021, coming on as a half-time substitute for Alisson Farias in a 1–0 Série B away win over Brasil de Pelotas.

Definitely promoted to the main squad for the 2021 campaign, Pedrinho renewed his contract until 2024 on 20 February 2021. He soon became a regular starter for the side, and was named the 2021 Campeonato Baiano Breakthrough player.

On 20 August 2021, amidst transfer negotiations with Athletico Paranaense, Vitória rescinded Pedrinho's contract. On 2 September, Vitória released a statement saying that despite the "conclusion of the transfer", Pedrinho's contract with Athletico was not registered, nor his contract with Vitória was not reinstated upon his return to Salvador.

Athletico Paranaense
On 17 September 2021, Athletico announced Pedrinho after the player signed a five-year contract. Despite agreeing on a R$ 8.5 million fee for his transfer, Athletico signed the player on a free transfer as his contract with Vitória was previously terminated; Athletico alleged that the player was a free agent at the time of the signature, and that the transfer was not completed due to problems with Vitória and Pablo Siles' agents, as the club planned to sign both players together on a R$ 10 million deal. In October, Athletico agreed to pay Vitória around R$ 3 million for the transfers of Pedrinho and Siles, while discounting R$ 3 million due to a debt of Vitória to Athletico over Léo Morais in 2013, and also paying another R$ 3 million for the transfer of Siles to Danubio.

Pedrinho made his Série A debut on 2 November 2021, replacing Nicolás Hernández in a 2–2 home draw against Flamengo. A backup to Abner Vinícius during the 2021 and 2022 seasons, he became a starter in 2023 after Abner left for Betis.

Career statistics

Honours

Individual
Campeonato Baiano Breakthrough player: 2021

References

External links
Athletico Paranaense profile 

2002 births
Living people
Sportspeople from Salvador, Bahia
Brazilian footballers
Association football defenders
Campeonato Brasileiro Série A players
Campeonato Brasileiro Série B players
Esporte Clube Vitória players
Club Athletico Paranaense players